Kjell Hallbing (5 November 1934, in Bærum – 6 May 2004, in Tønsberg) was a Norwegian author of Western books.

Under the pseudonym Louis Masterson, he wrote a series of books about the fictitious Texas Ranger (and later U.S. Marshal) Morgan Kane during 1966–1978. The 83 Morgan Kane books have sold more than 20 million copies worldwide. Masterson's books El Gringo and El Gringo's Revenge will be the basis of a Hollywood movie in 2017.
He has also written another nine-book series known as the Diablo- and Diablito books.
Earlier in his career Hallbing used the pseudonyms Ward Cameron, Leo Manning, Lee Morgan and Colin Hawkins. His debut, Ubåt-kontakt, was released in 1961, written under his real name. The same year he released his first book set in the old West, Portrett av en revolvermann ("Portrait of a Gunslinger"). In addition Kjell Hallbing was an avid weapons collector, resulting in his collection being one of the largest privately owned weapons collections in Norway at the time of his death. He also owned a little house at Bolkesjø, where he actually wrote most of the books in the Morgan Kane series.

Other "heroes" Hallbing/Masterson wrote about included Jesse Rawlins, Owen Metzgar and Clay Allison.

Before he started to write full-time in 1969, Hallbing worked as a bank employee. He is buried at Oslo Western Civil Cemetery.

External links

Notes 

20th-century Norwegian writers
Western (genre) writers
Collectors
1934 births
2004 deaths
Writers from Bærum